Cedrelopsis is a flowering plant genus in the family Rutaceae found in Madagascar.

Species:

 Cedrelopsis ambanjensis J.F. Leroy
 Cedrelopsis gracilis J.F. Leroy
 Cedrelopsis grevei Baill. & Courchet
 Cedrelopsis longibracteata J.F. Leroy
 Cedrelopsis microfoliolata J.F. Leroy
 Cedrelopsis procera J.F. Leroy
 Cedrelopsis rakotozafyi Cheek & M. Lescot
 Cedrelopsis trivalvis J.F. Leroy

References

External links
 Cedrelopsis on PlantSystematics.org

 
Rutaceae genera
Taxa named by Henri Ernest Baillon